"Too Good to Be True" is a song by Spanish house and electro house DJ and producer Danny Ávila and British pop rock band The Vamps featuring vocals from American rapper and actor Machine Gun Kelly. The song was released as a digital download on 2 March 2018 through Sony Music Entertainment. It serves as the second single from the Vamps' third studio album Night & Day, being included on the second part of it, called Day Edition.

Track listing

Charts

Release history

References

 

2017 songs
2017 singles
The Vamps (British band) songs
Machine Gun Kelly (musician) songs
Song recordings produced by Red Triangle (production team)
Songs written by Rick Parkhouse
Songs written by George Tizzard
Songs written by Machine Gun Kelly (musician)
Songs written by Bryn Christopher